The Bahrain News Agency (BNA) is the state news agency of Bahrain.

History and profile
The BNA was established in 1976 with the name of the Gulf News Agency. In 2001 it was renamed as the Bahrain News Agency. The agency is run under the Ministry of Information Affairs. It is a member of the Federation of Arab News Agencies (FANA). The BNA has both Arabic and English publications and is based in Manama.

In July 2013, the agency launched BNA Zaman, a service which documents Bahrain's landmark development achievements via pictures.

See also
 Federation of Arab News Agencies (FANA)

References

External links
 Bahrain News Agency 
 Bahrain News Agency 

1976 establishments in Bahrain
Government agencies established in 1976
News agencies based in Bahrain
Publicly funded broadcasters
Arab news agencies
State media